Stanisław Burza (born 26 September 1977 in Tuchów, Poland), nicknamed "Stan Storm", is a former motorcycle speedway rider from Poland.

Career 
Burza is a 2004 and 2005 Team Polish Champion.

Family
Stanisław Burza and his wife, Małgorzata, have one daughter, Justyna (born 2006). The Polish word burza means 'thunderstorm'.

Results

Domestic competitions 
 Individual Polish Championship
 2003 - Bydgoszcz - 10th place
 2009 - 11th place in Quarter-Final 4
 Team Polish Championship
 2004 - Polish Champion with Tarnów
 2005 - Polish Champion with Tarnów
 2006 - 4th place with Tarnów
 Team British Championship (Elite League)
 2007 - Elite League Champion

World Longtrack Championship

Grand=Prix Series
 2013 1 app (21st) 15pts

See also 
 Speedway in Poland

References 

1977 births
Belle Vue Aces riders
Berwick Bandits riders
Coventry Bees riders
Oxford Cheetahs riders
Living people
People from Tarnów County
Polish speedway riders
Sportspeople from Lesser Poland Voivodeship
Individual Speedway Long Track World Championship riders